Dindica glaucescens is a moth of the family Geometridae first described by Hiroshi Inoue in 1990. It is found in Hunan, China.

References

Moths described in 1990
Pseudoterpnini